Sanctuary is the debut solo studio album released by Blue band-member and singer, Simon Webbe. The album was released on 14 November 2005, peaking at number seven on the UK Albums Chart, selling more than 600,000 copies in the United Kingdom. The album was later certified double platinum by the BPI. Three singles were released from the album: "Lay Your Hands", which peaked at number four on the UK Singles Chart, "No Worries", which also peaked at number four, and "After All This Time", which peaked at number 16.

Track listing

Charts and certifications

Weekly charts

Year-end charts

Certifications

References

2005 debut albums
Simon Webbe albums
EMI Records albums
Innocent Records albums